Arthur Charles Wellesley, 5th Duke of Wellington,  (9 June 1876 – 11 December 1941), known as Arthur Wellesley from 1876 to 1900, and styled as Marquess of Douro from 1900 to 1934, was a British nobleman and landowner.

Background and military career
Wellesley was born in 1876 to Arthur Charles Wellesley (youngest son of Lord Charles Wellesley) and his wife, Kathleen Bulkeley Williams. Wellesley's father inherited the ducal title and vast Wellington estates upon his elder brother's death in 1900, and became the 4th Duke of Wellington.

Wellesley attended Eton between 1890 and 1895, and later attended Trinity College at Cambridge. He was commissioned as a lieutenant in the 4th (Militia) battalion of the Lincolnshire Regiment on 7 July 1897, and served as Aide-de-camp to the Earl of Ranfurly, Governor of New Zealand. After the outbreak of the Second Boer War in late 1899, he joined the regular army as a second lieutenant in the Grenadier Guards on 17 January 1900, and was part of a detachment sent to South Africa in March 1900 to reinforce the 3rd battalion fighting in the war. He served with his regiment there until July 1902, when he returned home after the war ended the previous month. He resigned his commission in 1903. He returned to active service as a temporary reserve second lieutenant in 1915, during World War I, and relinquished his commission in 1919, still a second lieutenant.

In 1934, he succeeded to the dukedom. He was also a justice of the peace.

Political activism
The duke was a supporter of several far right-wing causes. He was a member of the Anglo-German Fellowship from 1935 and served as President of the Liberty Restoration League, which was described by Inspector Pavey (an ex-Scotland Yard detective employed by the Board of Deputies of British Jews to infiltrate the far right) as being anti-semitic. When Archibald Maule Ramsay formed the 'Right Club' in 1939, Wellington chaired its early meetings. Ramsay, describing the Right Club, boasted that "The main objective was to oppose and expose the activities of organised Jewry." On the day that World War II broke out, the Duke of Wellington was quoted as blaming the conflict on "anti-appeasers and the fucking Jews".

Family
In 1909, he married Lilian Maud Glen Coats, elder daughter of George Coats (who became the 1st Baron Glentanar in 1916). They had two children:
 Lady Anne Wellesley (1910–1998), married the Hon. David Rhys, younger son of the 7th Baron Dynevor.
 Captain Henry Wellesley, 6th Duke of Wellington (1912–1943), unmarried.

Death
He died at 20 Devonshire Place, London.

References

External links 

 Duke of Wellington's Regiment – West Riding

1876 births
1941 deaths
Arthur Wellesley, 5th Duke of Wellington
Dukes of Ciudad Rodrigo
Dukes of Wellington
Dukes da Vitória
Grenadier Guards officers
British Army personnel of the Second Boer War
British Army personnel of World War I
Princes of Waterloo
Wellesley, Arthur 5
Antisemitism in the United Kingdom
British fascists
Earls of Mornington
English justices of the peace